Christian Conrad Ludwig Lange (born 4 March 1825 in Hanover; died 18 August 1885 in Leipzig) was a German philologist and archaeologist.

Biography
He studied at the University of Göttingen under Karl Friedrich Hermann, and in 1855 became a full professor of classical philology at the University of Prague. In 1859 he relocated as a professor to the University of Giessen, and in 1871 moved to Leipzig, where in 1879/80 he served as university rector.

His principal work was "Handbuch der römischen Altertümer" (3rd edition, 1876–79); and he also wrote "Der homerische Gebrauch der Partikel εἰ" (1872–73) and "Die Epheten und der Areopag vor Solon" (1874). His smaller writings were posthumously collected and edited, with a biographical sketch by K. Lange, under the title "Kleine Schriften aus dem Gebiete der classischen Alterthumswissenschaft" (1887).

Family
He married Adelheid Blume in 1854.  They had four children:  Konrad (1855–1921), an art historian; Ludwig, a physicist; Sophie; and Gertrud.

Notes

References
  This work in turn cites:
Neumann, Ludwig Lange (Berlin, 1886)
 Lange, Ludwig at Neue Deutsche Biographie

External link

1825 births
1885 deaths
Writers from Hanover
University of Göttingen alumni
Academic staff of the University of Giessen
Academic staff of Leipzig University
Archaeologists from Lower Saxony
German philologists